Maisí is a municipality and town in the Guantánamo Province of Cuba. Its administrative seat is located in the town of La Máquina.

Geography
The easternmost point of Cuba, Punta Maisí (called "Baitiquiri" by the Taino in pre-colonial times) is located in this municipality.

Demographics
In 2004, the municipality of Maisí had a population of 28,276.

See also
Punta Maisí Lighthouse
List of cities in Cuba
Municipalities of Cuba

References

External links

Maisi